Welham Girls' School is a private boarding school for girls located in Dehradun, Uttarakhand, India.

History 
The school was established in 1957. Welham was named after the little Welsh village from where its founder, H.S. Oliphant hailed. A retired English headmistress, Oliphant started Welham Boys' School in 1937. She was struck by The Lawrence School, Sanawar and lack of schools of similar quality for the girls around Dehradun.

She acquired a palatial estate called Nasreen adjacent to Welham Boys' School to start a small boarding school for girls. There were no funds, staff, or school buildings. Oliphant recruited another retired English woman, Grace Mary Linnel, to run the boarding school for girls. Linnel became the founder principal of Welham Girls School, which started in 1957. She was later awarded a Padma Shri for her contribution to education of girls. Welham Girls’ High School, as it was known then, established itself as a full-fledged boarding school. From its initial crop of 10 students, it has grown to over 550 students.

Extracurricular activities 
The school hosts competitive events such as sports, craft, dramatics, music, dance and photography.

Sports 

These include basketball, hockey, swimming, badminton, lawn tennis, athletics, table tennis, karate, shooting and aerobics. The basketball team has won numerous tournaments over the years and represented Uttrakhand at the national level. Several students have been chosen for the India camp as well.

The Duke of Edinburgh's Award scheme  is a programme that the school offers to its students.

Publications 

The school newspapers, News and Views in English and Kshitij in Hindi, are published every month, as well as a science magazine, Delphic. A technology-based publication, 'The Tech-Key' is also published 4 times a year. It is the newest addition in school, having started in April 2019. Two issues of the magazine The Wall are published each year. Additionally, the school publishes an English literary and art publication, Chrysalis, twice a term. The School Annual is published in summer each year.

Notable alumnae

Politics
 Meira Kumar, ex-presidential candidate and First Lady speaker of the Lok Sabha
 Brinda Karat, Member of Parliament, Communist Party of India (Marxist) 
 Subhashini Ali, activist, president All India Democratic Women's Association (AIDWA)
 Priyanka Gandhi, politician
 Malavika Rajkotia, lawyer and activist
 Neera Yadav, IAS officer
 Renuka Chowdhury, MP Rajya Sabha
  Pooja Elangbam, IAS Officer

Film
 Nitya Mehra, director and screenwriter 
 Kareena Kapoor Khan, actress
 Deepa Mehta, film director
 Advaita Kala , author and screenwriter 
 Priya Seth, cinematographer
 Alankrita Shrivastava, screenwriter and film director
 Aditi Vasudev, actress
 Nivedita Basu, film producer
 Shivani Rawat, producer
 Sukhmani Sadana, actor and screenwriter

Literature
 Deepti Kapoor, novelist

Journalism
 Madhu Trehan, journalist and co-founder of Newslaundry
 Tavleen Singh, non-fiction writer, journalist and columnist, Indian Express
 Radhika Roy, co-founder and co-owner of NDTV
 Iva Dixit, staff editor at The New York Times Magazine
 Gargi Rawat, news anchor and environment reporter, NDTV
 Nimisha Jaiswal, journalist and editor at Deutsche Welle

Sports
 Jyoti Ann Burrett, footballer

Art
 Smriti Morarka, hand-weaving revivalist
 Laila Tyabji, co-founder Dastkar
 Mrinalini Mukherjee, artist
 Mala Sen, writer and activist

Advertising
 Devika Bulchandani, Global CEO, Ogilvy

See also 
 Grace Mary Linnel

References

External links 
 Official school page
 Welham Girls Alumni website

Girls' schools in Uttarakhand
Boarding schools in Uttarakhand
Schools in Dehradun
Educational institutions established in 1957
1957 establishments in Uttar Pradesh
Private schools in Uttarakhand
Girls' schools in India
Girls boarding schools